Paul Martin is an English editor of the Irish Mail on Sunday and was best known for his appearances in Celebrity Come Dine With Me and boxing show Charity Lords of the Ring.

He regularly appears on the BBC Nolan radio show, News Night and Sky News as a panelist on the newspaper review section.

Irish Mirror
Martin worked as a showbiz columnist at the Irish Sunday Mirror, but was sacked during layoffs in 2012.

TV appearances 
In January 2012 Martin appeared in TV3's first series of TV cookery showCelebrity Come Dine With Me Ireland. Martin's fracas with Belfast-born singer-songwriter Brian Kennedy became a talking point of the show.

Martin also appeared in RTÉ reality television show Lords of the Ring.

Driving conviction
In 2010 Martin pleaded guilty to a charge of driving without reasonable consideration, after he was caught speeding and reading paperwork while driving.

References

Irish newspaper editors
Living people
Year of birth missing (living people)